Frank Clarke (1915–2002) was a British film editor. He worked for many years for the British branch of MGM at Elstree Studios.

Selected filmography

 Clothes and the Woman (1937)
 Tunisian Victory (1944)
 Spring in Park Lane (1948)
 Elizabeth of Ladymead (1949)
 Conspirator (1949)
 The Miniver Story (1950)
 Calling Bulldog Drummond (1951)
 Ivanhoe (1952)
 Never Let Me Go (1953)
 Time Bomb (1953)
 Mogambo (1953)
 Knights of the Round Table (1953)
 Beau Brummell (1954)
 Bedevilled (1955)
 Bhowani Junction (1956)
 The Barretts of Wimpole Street (1957)
 Action of the Tiger (1957)
 I Accuse! (1958)
 Tom Thumb (1958)
 Libel (1959)
 The Day They Robbed the Bank of England (1960)
 The Green Helmet (1961)
 A Matter of WHO (1961)
 Light in the Piazza (1962)
 I Thank a Fool (1962)
 Come Fly with Me (1963)
 The V.I.P.s (1963)
 The Golden Head (1964)
 The Yellow Rolls-Royce (1965)
 Pretty Polly (1967)
 Lock Up Your Daughters (1969)
 No Blade of Grass (1970)

References

Bibliography
 Perkins, Roy & Stollery, Martin. British Film Editors: The Heart of the Movie. Bloomsbury Publishing, 2019.

External links

1915 births
2002 deaths
British film editors
People from London